Luca Aiko Kumahara (formerly Caroline Aiko Kumahara, born June 27, 1995, in São Paulo, São Paulo) is a table tennis player from Brazil. He competed at the 2012 Summer Olympics, 2016 Summer Olympics and 2020 Summer Olympics.

He is the first trans athlete to compete at an international level.

Personal life
Luca is a trans man.

References

External links
 

Living people
1995 births
Sportspeople from São Paulo
Brazilian male table tennis players
Brazilian people of Japanese descent
Table tennis players at the 2012 Summer Olympics
Table tennis players at the 2016 Summer Olympics
Olympic table tennis players of Brazil
Table tennis players at the 2010 Summer Youth Olympics
Pan American Games bronze medalists for Brazil
Pan American Games medalists in table tennis
Table tennis players at the 2015 Pan American Games
Table tennis players at the 2019 Pan American Games
Medalists at the 2015 Pan American Games
Medalists at the 2019 Pan American Games
Brazilian LGBT sportspeople
Table tennis players at the 2020 Summer Olympics
21st-century LGBT people
Transgender men
Transgender sportsmen
21st-century Brazilian people
LGBT table tennis players